Kastoria B.C. (Greek: Καστοριάς K.A.E.), is a Greek professional basketball club that is based in Kastoria, Greece. The club's full name is Athlitikos Syllogos Kastorias (Αθλητικός Σύλλογος Καστοριάς), which is abbreviated as A.S. Kastoria (Α.Σ. Καστοριάς). The club's colors are white and black, and the team's emblem is a beaver.

History
Kastoria played in the Greek 4th-tier level, the Greek C League, in the 2006–07 season. The club was promoted up to the 3rd-tier level, the Greek B League, for the 2015–16 season. The club then moved up to the 2nd-tier level, the Greek A2 League, for the 2017–18 season.

The well-known Greek player, Dimitris Diamantidis, began his career with the club's youth teams.

Arena
Kastoria plays its home games at the Dimitris Diamantidis Indoor Hall, which is named after the well-known Greek basketball player, Dimitris Diamantidis.

Season by season

Honours
Total titles: 1

Domestic competitions
 Greek 3rd Division
 Winners (1): 2016–17

Notable players

  Tasos Charismidis
  Nikos Kaklamanos
  Ioannis Karamalegkos
  Giannis Kyriakopoulos

Youth players
  Dimitris Diamantidis

References

External links
Official Website 
Eurobasket.com Team Profile

Basketball teams in Greece
Basketball teams established in 1980